Ayman Mazhar (born 22 November 1959) is an Egyptian sports shooter. He competed in the men's double trap event at the 2000 Summer Olympics.

References

1959 births
Living people
Egyptian male sport shooters
Olympic shooters of Egypt
Shooters at the 2000 Summer Olympics
Place of birth missing (living people)